Gilchrist is a surname of Gaelic language origins. In many cases it is derived from a Scottish Gaelic name, Gille Chrìost, Gille Chriosd, meaning "servant of Christ" (i.e. gilla "servant", chriosd "Christ"). Surnames of similar origins include  MacGilchrist and McGilchrist, which are usually derived from Mac Giolla Chriosd or, literally, "son of the servant of Christ". Early, semi-anglicised versions of the surname, recorded include Geilchreist, Gilchryst, Gillchreist, Gillcryst, Mcillchreist and Mylchrest.  

In many, perhaps most, cases, people with these surnames are descendants of the Scottish Clan Gilchrist, a sept of Clan MacLachlan.

People
 Adam Gilchrist (born 1971), Australian cricketer
 Albert W. Gilchrist (1858–1926), governor of Florida
 Alexander Gilchrist (1828–1861), British biographer
 Alfred J. Gilchrist (1872–1931), New York politician
 Andrew Gilchrist (1910–1993), UK ambassador to Iceland, Indonesia and Ireland
 Anne Gilchrist (disambiguation), several people
 Anne Gilchrist (writer) (1828–1885), English writer 
 Anne Gilchrist (collector) (1863–1954), British folk-song collector
 Annie Somers Gilchrist (1841-1912), American writer
 Augustus Gilchrist (born 1989), American basketball player
 Brent Gilchrist (born 1967), Canadian ice hockey player
 Bruce Gilchrist (1930–2015), Notable figure in modern computing
 Charles W. Gilchrist, Montgomery County, Maryland politician
 Cameron Gilchrist, Scottish footballer
 Connie Gilchrist (1901–1985), American stage and screen actress
 Connie Gilchrist, Countess of Orkney (1865–1946), child actor and artist's model
 Cookie Gilchrist (1935–2011), American football player
 Craig Gilchrist (born 1970), South African basketball coach and former player
 Donald Gilchrist (1922–2017), Canadian figure skater paired with Marlene Smith
 Ellen Gilchrist (born 1935), American novelist
 Emma Gilchrist, Canadian journalist
 Garlin Gilchrist (born 1982), lieutenant governor of Michigan
 Gordon Gilchrist  (born 1985) Scottish Artist
 Gordon Gilchrist (born 1928), Canadian politician
 Grant Gilchrist (born 1990), Scottish rugby union player
 Guy Gilchrist, American cartoonist
 Harald Gilchrist, the 19th/20th king of Norway during the Civil War Era
 James Gilchrist (tenor), tenor
 Jeremy Gilchrist (born 1986), US and Canadian football wide receiver
 Jim Gilchrist (born 1949), founder of the Minutemen Project
 John Gilchrist (disambiguation), several people
 John Gilchrist (actor) (born 1968), former child actor
 John Gilchrist (basketball) (born 1985), American basketball player
 John Gilchrist (cricketer) (born 1932), English cricketer
 John Gilchrist (footballer, born 1900) (1900–1950), Scottish footballer
 John Gilchrist (footballer, born 1939) (1939–1991), Scottish footballer
 John Gilchrist (judge) (1809–1858), American judge
 John Gilchrist (linguist) (1759–1841), Scottish surgeon and Indologist
 John Gilchrist (New Zealand politician) (1872–1947), political activist
 John Gilchrist (Province of Canada politician) (1792–1859), politician in Province of Canada
 John Gilchrist (zoologist) (1866–1926), Scottish South African ichthyologist
 Joyce Gilchrist, forensic chemist 
 Keir Gilchrist, British-Canadian actor
 Lara Gilchrist, Canadian actress
 Len Gilchrist (1881–1958), English footballer 
 Marcus Gilchrist, American football player
 Michael Gilchrist (born 1960), New Zealand athlete
 Michael Kidd-Gilchrist (born 1993), American basketball player
 Nathan Gilchrist, English cricketer
 Percy Gilchrist (1851–1935), British chemist and metallurgist
 Robert Murray Gilchrist (1867–1917), horror writer
 Rosetta Luce Gilchrist (1850–1921), American physician, writer
 Roy Gilchrist (1934–2001), West Indies cricketer
 Stephen Gilchrist, English drummer
 Stephen Gilchrist Glover (born 1974), American television personality Steve-O
 Steve Gilchrist (born 1954), Canadian politician
 William Gilchrist, American composer
 William Sidney Gilchrist, medical missionary to Angola

Given name
 Sidney Gilchrist Thomas, British inventor

See also
 Gilchrest (surname)
 Michael Kidd-Gilchrist (born 1993), American basketball player
 Gilla Críst, cognate personal name
 Cill Chriosd, cognate place name

References

English-language surnames
Scottish surnames
Anglicised Scottish Gaelic-language surnames